Hana Maria Pravda (Becková; after first marriage, Munk; after second marriage, Pravda; 29 January 1916 − 22 May 2008) was a Czech actress.

Biography
Hana Becková was born in Prague, 29 January 1916.
She trained in Leningrad in 1936 under Alexei Dikii. On her return to Prague, she married her first husband, Alexander Munk who was a student activist.

Pravda worked in Czech theatre before the outbreak of World War II and made five films (under the names Hana Becková, Hana Bělská, Hana Alexandrová and Hana Pravdová).

When the war broke out, Hana and her husband Alexander Munk were sent to Theresienstadt concentration camp and were subsequently transferred to the Auschwitz concentration camp where they became separated. She survived the camp and the subsequent January 1945 death march and recorded her experiences in a diary. She later found out that her husband had died.

She returned to Prague and continued to act in the realistic theatre where she met George Pravda. She emigrated to the United Kingdom with him and continued her career. Pravda's most well-known role was as Emma Cohen in the 1970s television drama Survivors. She also appeared as the wife of the innkeeper (played by her real-life husband George) in the Jack Palance version of Dracula (1974). Other TV credits include: Danger Man, Department S, Callan, Z-Cars, Dad's Army and Tales of the Unexpected.

Pravda's wartime diary was published as I Was Writing This Diary For You, Sasha (2000). She also published a collection of autobiographical stories, Kaleidoscope: Snapshots of My Life (2002).

Personal life
Pravda died, 22 May 2008, in Oxford, England.
Her son, Dr Alex Pravda, is an academic. Her granddaughter is the English actress Isobel Pravda. Her first cousin was the Czech-Chilean businessman Milan Platovsky.

Bibliography
 I Was Writing This Diary For You, Sasha (2000) 
 Kaleidoscope: Snapshots of My Life (2002)

Partial filmography
On the Sunny Side (1933) - Willi
Marijka nevěrnice (1934)
První políbení (1935) - Věra
Nikola Šuhaj (1947)
The Long Shadow (1961) - Matron
Before Winter Comes (1969) - Beata
The Kremlin Letter (1970) - Mrs. Kazar
And Soon the Darkness (1970) - Madame Lassal
Death Wish 3 (1985) - Mrs. Kaprov
The Unbearable Lightness of Being (1988)
Follow Me (1989) - 2. alte Frau
Bullseye! (1990) - Old Lady at Seance
Shining Through (1992) - Babysitter
Leon the Pig Farmer (1992) - Woman
The Man Who Cried (2000) - Grandmother
Paradise Grove (2003) - Ruth Posnitch (final film role)

References

Sources
 "Holocaust diarist is played by actress granddaughter", Dalya Alberge, Evening Standard, Dri 11 Jan 2013 p. 29

External links

 

1916 births
2008 deaths
Czech stage actresses
Czech television actresses
British television actresses
British Jews
Theresienstadt Ghetto survivors
Auschwitz concentration camp survivors
Czechoslovak emigrants to the United Kingdom
Czech diarists
Women diarists
British people of Czech-Jewish descent
20th-century diarists